Klenät, kleinur,
klena, klejne, kleina, kleyna, and fattigmann are all names for Angel wings, a fried pastry common in the Nordic countries as well as the rest of Europe and the United States. In nearby countries (such as Lithuania, is found under the name žagarėliai) and Eastern European countries (such as Romania under the name of minciunele  or Russia, under the name krepli). The name is related to klen, the Swedish term for "slender", but is originally of Low German origin, which may indicate that the pastry was originally German. It is made from flattened dough cut into small trapezoids. A slit is cut in the middle and then one or both ends pulled through the slit to form a "knot". The kleina is then deep-fried in oil or another kind of fat. Subsequently can be sprinkled with powdered sugar and cinnamon.

In Scandinavia, klenäter are traditionally eaten around Christmas, most commonly in the southern parts of Sweden, and Iceland, Norway, the Faroe Islands, Greenland and Denmark, the Baltic states, as well as Northern Germany. They may be sprinkled with sugar. Icelandic Kleinur are a very common everyday pastry, sold in bakeries (singly) and stores (in bags of ten or so) all around the country, and eaten plain.

Klenäter are similar to the American cruller.

History
Klenäter are an old type of pastry and are mentioned in Denmark as early as the 14th century and appearing in Danish and Icelandic cookbooks in the 18th century and 19th century. They are also referenced in a Swedish poem by Anna Maria Lenngren from 1800, called Grevinnans besök (English: The Countess' Visit). In the poem, a countess is invited to a dinner party at the home of a pastor, where she is served klenäter as part of the entrée. Klenäter also frequently appear in Christmas stories by famous Swedish author Selma Lagerlöf, winner of the Nobel Prize in Literature in 1909.

Regional variations

In Norway, klenäter are known as fattigmann (English: poor man), or fattigmannsbakkels (English: poor man's pastry), because, it was said, the high cost of making the cookies could leave you impoverished (fattig). Fattigmann tend to be made with cinnamon, cardamom and a dash of cognac as well as the other ingredients listed below.

They are also eaten in the areas of North America where Scandinavians settled during the nineteenth century and the beginning of the twentieth century.

A similar pastry called "calzones rotos" (literally "broken panties") is eaten during winter in Chile.

Preparation

The dough for klenäter is made from flour, egg yolks, sugar, and margarine or butter. The dough is rolled out and then cut into strips, in Iceland often with a special cutting wheel called a kleinujárn. (A pizza cutter can also be used.) The uncooked strips are covered with plastic wrap and left to rest for two hours in a cold place. They are then fried in oil or sometimes lard and the dough expands into shape. Traditionally, Icelanders fried kleinur in sheep tallow, but today oil is typically used.

Lemon juice, brännvin or cognac are optional ingredients in klenäter. Water mixed with acetic acid can be used instead. An alternative type of klenäter is smördegsklenätter (English: puff pastry klenäter).

Klenäter should be kept in a dry place. The non-fried dough can be preserved in a refrigerator for a week. Klenäter are best served medium-warm and newly baked.

See also
 List of doughnut varieties
 List of breakfast foods

References

External links 

Danish cuisine
Swedish pastries
Norwegian cuisine
Icelandic cuisine
Doughnuts
Deep fried foods
Christmas food